Chinese mugwort is a common name for several plants and may refer to:

Artemisia argyi
Artemisia verlotiorum